Yugoslavia was present at the Eurovision Song Contest 1965, held in Naples, Italy.

Before Eurovision

Jugovizija 1965 
The Yugoslav national final to select their entry, was held on 6 February at the Radnički Dom in Zagreb. The host was Željka Marković. There were 8 songs in the final, from five subnational public broadcasters. The subnational public broadcaster  RTV Skopje made a comeback. The winner was chosen by the votes of an eight-member jury of experts, one juror for each of the six republics and the two autonomous provinces.  The winning entry was "Čežnja" performed by Croatian singer Vice Vukov, composed by Julijo Marić and written by Žarko Roje. Vice Vukov had already won the National final two years earlier and had represented Yugoslavia at the 1963 Eurovision Song Contest.

At Eurovision
Vice Vukov performed 17th on the night of the Contest following Finland and preceding Switzerland. At the close of the voting the song had received 2 points, coming 12th in the field of 18 competing countries.

Voting

Notes

References

External links
Eurodalmatia official ESC club
Eurovision Song Contest National Finals' Homepage
Eurovision France
ECSSerbia.com
OGAE North Macedonia

1965
Countries in the Eurovision Song Contest 1965
Eurovision